Thorns is the second studio album by Portuguese band Icon & The Black Roses. It was released on March 29, 2014, following their reunion in 2011.

In 2011, the band announced their return with a new line up, whilst songs from the first album were featured on the hit video game, Rockband.

In 2013, the band released a lyric video for "Wings of a Dreamer", an advance from Thorns. Thorns was recorded between Lisbon, London and Alessandria, and mixed by Daniel Cardoso.

Reviews

Track listing

Personnel

Icon & the Black Roses
 Johnny Icon – lead vocals
 Lucien Yorg – guitars
 Sean Rose – bass
 Antonio Agate – keyboards
 Jax Cairn - drums

References

External links
 Iconandtheblackroses.com

2014 albums
Icon & The Black Roses albums